Eucalyptus viminalis, commonly known as the manna gum, white gum or ribbon gum, is a species of small to very tall tree that is endemic to south-eastern Australia. It has smooth bark, sometimes with rough bark near the base, lance-shaped to curved adult leaves, flower buds in groups of three or seven, white flowers and cup-shaped or hemispherical fruit.

Description
It has smooth, often powdery, white to pale brown bark that is shed in long ribbons, sometimes hanging on the upper branches, and sometimes with rough, fibrous bark on the lower trunk. Flowering occurs from December to May and the flowers are white.

Taxonomy and naming
Eucalyptus viminalis was first formally described in 1806 by Jacques Labillardière in his book Novae Hollandiae Plantarum Specimen. The specific epithet (viminalis) is a Latin word meaning "bearing shoots or ribbons for wicker work.

The following subspecies are accepted by the Australian Plant Census:
 Eucalyptus viminalis subsp. hentyensis Brooker & Slee has little rough bark, coarse, broad juvenile leaves and flower buds in groups of three or seven; 
 Eucalyptus viminalis Labill. subsp. viminalis is most easily distinguished by it many pairs of sessile, lance-shaped, green juvenile leaves that are arranged in opposite pairs. It is also usually smooth-barked and has flower buds mostly in groups of three.

According to the early Australian ethnographer Alfred William Howitt, the name wurundjeri, in his transcription urunjeri, refers to E. viminalis which is common along Birrarung. Some modern reports of Wurundjeri traditional lore state that their ethnonym combines a word, wurun, meaning manna gum and djeri, a species of grub found in the tree, and take the word therefore to mean "Witchetty Grub People".

Distribution and habitat
Subspecies cygnetensis, commonly known as the rough-barked manna gum, grows in the higher rainfall areas of South Australia, including Kangaroo Island and the southern Mount Lofty Ranges and as far east as the Grampians in Victoria. Subspecies hentyensis, commonly known as the western Tasmanian sand gum, grows in sandy soil on the west coast of Tasmania, north from Strahan. Subspecies pryoriana, commonly known as the Gippsland manna gum, grows in sandy, coastal soil from the Bellarine Peninsula to Lake Tyers in the Gippsland Lakes in Victoria. Subspecies siliceana is known only from the Wail State Forest in the Wimmera region of Victoria, where it grows in deep sand. Subspecies viminalis is widely distributed and abundant in the well-watered areas of south-eastern Australia, from the coast and ranges of New South Wales, the southern half of Victoria, the Eyre Peninsula and Kangaroo Island in south-eastern South Australia.

Uses
Indigenous Australians used the wood of the tree to make shields and wooden bowls.

The 1889 book The Useful Native Plants of Australia records that common names included white gum or swamp gum of Tasmania, manna gum, grey gum, blue gum, and drooping gum. It also states that "From the bark of this tree a kind of manna exudes. It is a crumbly white substance, of a very pleasant, sweet taste, and in much request by the aborigines. A white, nearly opaque manna from the normal E. viminalis was found by Mr. Bauerlen at Monga, near Braidwood (New South Wales). It is in small pieces, about the size of peas, but of irregular, flattened shape. In appearance it very much resembles lime which has naturally crumbled or slaked by exposure to a moist atmosphere. It is composed of an unfermentable sugar called Eucalin, which is peculiar to the sap of the Eucalyptus, together with a fermentable sugar, supposed to be Dextroglucose. The manna is derived from the exudation of the sap, which "drying in the hot parched air of the midsummer, leaves the sugary solid remains in a gradually increasing lump, which ultimately falls off, covering the ground in little irregular masses." (McCoy.) This exudation of the sap is said by McCoy to take place from the boring of the "Great Black or Manna Cicada" (C. mœrens.) The Hon. William Macleay of Sydney is, however, by no means of that opinion, as he thinks it cannot be doubted that the manna is the work of a gall-making Coccus. The subject requires clearing up, and it is to be hoped that a naturalist will give his earnest attention to the matter."

Gallery

See also
 List of Eucalyptus species
 List of superlative trees

References

viminalis
Trees of Australia
Flora of the Australian Capital Territory
Flora of New South Wales
Flora of South Australia
Flora of Tasmania
Flora of Victoria (Australia)
Myrtales of Australia
Plants described in 1806
Taxa named by Jacques Labillardière